United Nations Security Council resolution 511, adopted on 18 June 1982, after recalling previous resolutions on the topic, particularly resolutions 508 (1982) and 509 (1982), and considering a report from the Secretary-General on the United Nations Interim Force in Lebanon (UNIFIL), the Council decided to extend the mandate of UNIFIL for another two months, ending on 19 August 1982.

The Council then called upon all parties to concerned to cooperate fully with the Force, and for the Secretary-General to keep the Council regularly informed on the situation.

Resolution 511 was adopted by 13 votes to none, while the People's Republic of Poland and Soviet Union abstained from voting.

See also
 1982 Lebanon War
 Blue Line
 Israeli–Lebanese conflict
 List of United Nations Security Council Resolutions 501 to 600 (1982–1987)

References
Text of the Resolution at undocs.org

External links
 

 0511
Israeli–Lebanese conflict
 0511
1982 in Israel
1982 in Lebanon
 0511
June 1982 events